Ingrid Burley (born December 19, 1986), known professionally as Ingrid (formerly IB3), is an American singer, rapper and songwriter. Born and raised in Houston, Texas, Burley's mother was close to Tina Knowles and Mathew Knowles, who signed Burley to his record label, Music World, when she was an upcoming rap artist. She began her career at age 11, as part of Trio, which was managed by Knowles.

Burley became notable for her songwriting deal with Sony/ATV Music Publishing, which involved her recording demos for artists such as Beyoncé. in 2013, Burley contributed vocals to the song "Blow", from Beyoncé's self-titled album. Burley also worked on Beyoncé's following album, writing the song "Love Drought" for the album Lemonade.

In 2015, Burley announced that she had signed a contract with Beyoncé's record label, Parkwood Entertainment, alongside Chloe x Halle and Sophie Beem. Burley released her debut EP under the record label on June 17, 2016, entitled Trill Feels.

Discography 

Albums

Extended plays

Singles

Concert tours

Supporting
 The Formation World Tour (2016)

References 

1986 births
Living people
20th-century American singers
African-American women singer-songwriters
African-American women writers
American women writers
American women singer-songwriters
American hip hop singers
American music publishers (people)
American contemporary R&B singers
American soul singers
Businesspeople from Houston
Columbia Records artists
Female music video directors
Music video codirectors
Musicians from Houston
Parkwood Entertainment artists
Singer-songwriters from Texas
Singers from New York City
Sony Music Publishing artists
20th-century American women singers
21st-century American women singers
Singer-songwriters from New York (state)